Melchior de Lisle (22 February 1908-26 August 1977) was a French entomologist.
He specialised in Coleoptera Lucanidae.

His life 
A biography was written by Jean-Pierre Lacroix

In 1933 he marries Christiane Frommer who will hold in Paris a renowned music lounge.

He was a technician of value, an alumnus of the École polytechnique.

In Cameroon he manages works of infrastructure (bridges), on returning to Paris he is a headmaster of an engineering school. He  is an excellent pianist.

Entomological works 
During his stay in Cameroon, he is interested in cetonids, the customs of which he observes and he describes new forms or new subspecies.

Of return in Europe, he is fascinated by the Lucanidae. He  gathers an important collection and describes numerous new taxa. His most important works are published in a Swiss zoological journal.

He also studied the Cerambycidae.

Entomological terms named after him  
 Bangalaia lislei Villiers, 1941
 Dorcus delislei Nagai & Tsukawaki, 1999
 Figulus delislei Benesh, 1953
 Goniochernes lislei Vachon, 1941
 Horridocalia delislei Endrödi, 1974
 Ixorida venera delislei Miksic, 1972
 Prismognathus delislei Endrödi, 1971
 Rosenbergia lislei Rigout, 1981
 Sclerostomus delislei Weinreich, 1961
 Smaragdesthes delislei Paulian, 1940

List of the taxa he created 
The list of the 103 taxa he created, fully referenced, is published on the web.

References

French entomologists
Coleopterists
1908 births
1977 deaths
20th-century French zoologists